Romuald Ntsitsigui Ewouta (born 8 April 1991) is a Gabonese footballer who plays as a striker for Gabonese club Mangasport and the Gabon national team.

Honours

Club
Mangasport
 Gabon Championnat National D1: 2013–14, 2014–15, 2018

Tirana
 Albanian Cup: 2016–17

References

External links
 

1991 births
Living people
People from Moanda
Gabonese footballers
Gabon international footballers
Association football forwards
AS Mangasport players
KF Tirana players
Kategoria Superiore players
Gabonese expatriate footballers
Gabonese expatriate sportspeople in Albania
Expatriate footballers in Albania
21st-century Gabonese people
2011 African Nations Championship players
Gabon A' international footballers
2016 African Nations Championship players